Bidborough is a village and civil parish in the borough of Tunbridge Wells in Kent, England, north of Royal Tunbridge Wells and south of Tonbridge.  According to the 2001 census it had a population of 958, increasing to 1,163 at the 2011 Census.

Amenities
Amenities include the primary school, the 'Kentish Hare' pub (purchased in 2012 by a local resident and extensively refurbished), the historic 11th-century church of St Lawrence, and nearby community hall. The village has its own amateur dramatic group, 'BADS', which puts on productions twice a year, as well as a youth group, Women's Institute and a gardening association. The village also has its own garage, shop and used to have a post office that closed in 2008.

Sports facilities include a tennis court, a bowls green and two recreation ground areas, which are available for cricket and five-a-side football.

Transport
Buses 231/233 connect Bidborough to Edenbridge and Tunbridge Wells. The bus 235 links Leigh to Bidborough and Tunbridge Wells. The bus 237 links Chiddingstone to Bidborough and Tunbridge Wells.

References

External links

Villages in Kent
Civil parishes in Kent